Felts Field  is a public airport in the northwest United States, located  northeast of downtown Spokane, in Spokane County, Washington. It is owned by Spokane City-County.

The airport has two parallel runways. Now used for general aviation, Felts Field was Spokane's commercial airport before the opening of Spokane International Airport.

The Federal Aviation Administration (FAA) National Plan of Integrated Airport Systems for 2017–2021 categorized it as a regional reliever facility.

History 

Felts Field, Spokane's historic airfield, is on the south bank of the Spokane River east of Spokane. Aviation activities began in 1913. Then called the Parkwater airstrip, it was designated a municipal flying field in 1920 at the instigation of the Spokane Chamber of Commerce.

In 1926, the Department of Commerce recognized Parkwater as an airport, one of the first in the West. In September 1927, in conjunction with Spokane's National Air Races that Felts Field hosted, the airport was renamed Felts Field  for James Buell Felts (1898–1927), a Washington Air National Guard aviator killed in a crash that May. Parkwater Aviation Field, later Felts Field, was the location for flight instruction, charter service, airplane repair, aerial photography, headquarters of the 116th Observation Squadron of the Washington Air National Guard, and eventually the first airmail and commercial flights in and out of Spokane.

In the summer of 1946, the airlines (Northwest and United) moved west to Geiger Field (later Spokane International Airport). Felts Field remains a busy regional hub for private and small-plane aviation and related businesses and services. In 1991, it was designated Felts Field Historic District on the National Register of Historic Places.

Today the airport is used for general aviation. No scheduled passenger service remains at Felts, though scheduled Part 135 cargo operations remain via UPS and DHL contracting (Ameriflight LLC and previously Merlin Express Airways).

Facilities 

It has two runways: 4L/22R is  concrete and 4R/22L is  asphalt. It has a seaplane landing area designated 3W/21W, . The runways were formerly numbered 3/21.

In the year ending February 28, 2015, it had 54,881 aircraft operations, averaging 150 per day: 93% general aviation, 7% air taxi, and <1% military. In July 2017, 176 aircraft were based at Felts Field: 146 single-engine, 15 multi-engine, and 15 helicopters.

Historic Flight Foundation museum
The hangar facilities at the airport house the Historic Flight Foundation aviation museum. The museum was opened to the public in 2019 as a second location to the Historic Flight Foundation's Paine Field museum in Everett, Washington.

Cargo carriers

Accidents and incidents
 On the morning of Saturday, November 29, 2003, an Ameriflight LLC cargo (Fairchild Swearingen Metroliner) (N439AF) crashed on approach to runway 22R at Felts Field using the ILS. The pilot's HSI was previously noted as inoperative, deferred, and due for scheduled maintenance.  It is unclear whether the pilot was using backup instrumentation as prescribed via the deferral process or using the faulty HSI.  The Metro III failed to maintain ILS glide slope and crashed short of the runway into rising terrain and trees. The pilot was killed during the subsequent impact and fire.  The aircraft was damaged beyond repair.

See also
 Washington World War II Army Airfields

References

External links

National Park Service – Felts Field Historic District

Washington State Department of Transportation – Felts Field
 
 

Airports in Washington (state)
Airfields of the United States Army Air Forces in Washington (state)
Buildings and structures in Spokane, Washington
Transportation in Spokane, Washington
1913 establishments in Washington (state)
Airports established in 1913
National Register of Historic Places in Spokane, Washington
Historic districts on the National Register of Historic Places in Washington (state)
Transportation buildings and structures in Spokane County, Washington